Trade Union Social Citizens List is a political group in Høje-Taastrup, Denmark.

In the 2005 municipal elections FSB got 351 votes (1.5%) and no seat. Its main candidate was Marianne Videbæk Bendtsen, who got 115 personal preference votes.

External links
 FSB website

Local political parties in Denmark
Political parties with year of establishment missing